Ellis Island is an island in the Mississippi River. The island is entirely within St. Charles County, Missouri.

The namesake of Ellis Island is unknown.

References

Landforms of St. Charles County, Missouri
River islands of Missouri
Islands of the Mississippi River